Francis Henry Jeune, 1st Baron St Helier,  (17 March 1843 – 9 April 1905), known as Sir Francis Jeune (1891–1905), was a British judge. He was President of the Probate, Divorce and Admiralty Division of the High Court of Justice (1892–1905) and Judge Advocate General (1892–1905).

Background and education
Jeune was the son of The Right Reverend Francis Jeune, Bishop of Peterborough, and Margaret, daughter of Henry Symons. Educated at Harrow and Balliol College, Oxford, he was President of the Oxford Union in 1864. In 1868, he was called to the Bar, Inner Temple.

Judicial career
In 1888, Jeune became a Queen's Counsel. In 1891, he was appointed as a Judge in the Probate, Divorce and Admiralty Division of the High Court and knighted. In June 1892, he became President of the Division in succession to Sir Charles Parker Butt and sworn of the Privy Council.

In December of that year, he was also appointed Judge Advocate General by Liberal Prime Minister William Ewart Gladstone. He continued as President of the Probate, Divorce and Admiralty Division until January 1905 when, beset by ill health, he resigned. In 1897, he was appointed a Knight Commander of the Order of the Bath (KCB). Five years later he was promoted to a Knight Grand Cross of the order (GCB) in the 1902 Coronation Honours list published on 26 June 1902, and was invested by King Edward VII at Buckingham Palace on 8 August 1902. In February 1905, he was granted an annuity of £3,500 and raised to the peerage as Baron St Helier of St Helier in the Island of Jersey and of Arlington Manor in the County of Berkshire.

Family
On 17 August 1881, Lord St Helier married Susan Mary Elizabeth Stanley, the recently widowed daughter of Keith William Stewart-Mackenzie and Hannah Charlotte Hope-Vere. In 1882, their only child together, a son, Francis Jeune, was born; on 19 August 1904, he died of enteric fever in Poona, India. Lord St Helier died the next year, on 9 April 1905, aged 62. As he had no surviving male issue, the barony died with him. Lady St Helier became a Dame Commander of the Order of the British Empire in 1925. She died on 25 January 1931, aged 85.

Works 
The Mahometan Power in India - 1867

References

Sources
 The Times, Monday, 22 August 1904; p. 7
 The Times, Monday, 10 April 1905; p. 6
 The Times, Monday, 26 January 1931; p. 12
 The Times, Friday, 8 October 1965; p. 1
 The Times, Saturday, 4 June 1966; p. 2
 "Alexander Mackenzie, History of The Mackenzies"
 Profile at worldroots.com

External links

1843 births
1905 deaths
People educated at Harrow School
Alumni of Balliol College, Oxford
Barons in the Peerage of the United Kingdom
19th-century English judges
People from Saint Helier
Knights Grand Cross of the Order of the Bath
Probate, Divorce and Admiralty Division judges
Members of the Privy Council of the United Kingdom
Knights Bachelor
Presidents of the Oxford Union
20th-century English judges
Peers created by Edward VII
Presidents of the Probate, Divorce and Admiralty Division